Invernizzi may refer to :

Surname 
 Corrado Invernizzi, Italian actor
 Giovanni Invernizzi, surname of three sportspersons :
 Giovanni Invernizzi (1931–2005), Italian international football player
 Giovanni Invernizzi, Italian football player and coach born in 1963
 Giovanni Invernizzi (1926–1986), Italian Olympic champion rower
 Roberta Invernizzi, Italian soprano
 Marco Invernizzi, Italian bonsai artist
 Marcia A. Invernizzi, Italian professor and author specialized in Reading Education

Astronomy 
 43957 Invernizzi, a main-belt asteroid

Italian-language surnames